The 1993–94 NBA season was the 76ers 45th season in the National Basketball Association, and 31st season in Philadelphia. In the 1993 NBA draft, the Sixers selected Shawn Bradley out of BYU with the second overall pick. During the off-season, the Sixers re-signed free agent and former All-Star forward Moses Malone, acquired Dana Barros from the Charlotte Hornets, who acquired him from the Seattle SuperSonics two days prior, and signed Orlando Woolridge in November. With the addition of Bradley, the Sixers tried to build a team around him. Malone, the starting center for the Sixers from 1982 to 1986, was signed to help develop the 7' 6" center from Utah, but it was to no avail. Bradley went down with a knee injury after only just 49 games, and was out for the remainder of the season. 

The Sixers got off to a slow start losing 11 of their first 15 games, but managed to hold a 20–27 record at the All-Star break. At midseason, Jeff Hornacek was traded to the Utah Jazz in exchange for Jeff Malone. After a 20–26 start, the Sixers suffered a 15-game losing streak between February and March. The team continued to struggle as they went on an 11-game losing streak between March and April, losing 31 of their final 36 games, and finishing sixth in the Atlantic Division with a 25–57 record. 

Second-year star Clarence Weatherspoon averaged 18.4 points, 10.1 rebounds and 1.4 blocks per game, while Barros averaged 13.3 points, 5.2 assists and 1.3 steals per game, and Bradley provided the team with 10.3 points, 6.2 rebounds and 3.0 blocks per game, and was named to the NBA All-Rookie Second Team. In addition, Woolridge contributed 12.7 points per game off the bench, while Tim Perry provided with 9.0 points and 5.1 rebounds per game, and Malone averaged 5.3 points and 4.1 rebounds per game off the bench.

Following the season, Malone was released to free agency and signed as a free agent with the San Antonio Spurs, while Johnny Dawkins signed with the Detroit Pistons, Woolridge retired, and head coach Fred Carter was fired.

Offseason

Draft picks

Roster

Regular season

Season standings

z - clinched division title
y - clinched division title
x - clinched playoff spot

Record vs. opponents

Player statistics

Awards and records
Shawn Bradley, NBA All-Rookie Team 2nd Team

References

See also
1993-94 NBA season

Philadelphia 76ers seasons
Philadelphia
Philadelphia
Philadelphia